In algebra, a seminormal ring is a commutative reduced ring in which, whenever x, y satisfy , there is s with  and .

A basic example is an integrally closed domain, i.e., a normal ring. For an example which is not normal, one can consider the non-integral ring , or the ring of a nodal curve.

In general, a reduced scheme  can be said to be seminormal if every morphism  which induces a homeomorphism of topological spaces, and an isomorphism on all residue fields, is an isomorphism of schemes.

A semigroup is said to be seminormal if its semigroup algebra is seminormal.

References 

Charles Weibel, The K-book: An introduction to algebraic K-theory

Commutative algebra
Ring theory